Paulo Daniel Fernandes Tavares (born 9 December 1985) is a Portuguese professional footballer who plays as a midfielder for Campeonato de Portugal side Lusitânia.

He made his first team debut with Leixões in May 2004, and then spent the next four years on loan with lower league clubs Padroense, Ribeirão, and Estoril. He played in the Primeira Liga with Leixões in 2008–09, though the club were relegated the following season. He returned to the Primeira Liga when he signed with Vitória Setúbal in July 2012, and remained with the club for four years. He joined English club Port Vale in July 2016. He returned to Portugal and joined Cova da Piedade in August 2017. In February 2018, he travelled to Vietnam to sign for Hồ Chí Minh City. He returned to Portugal to play for Lusitânia in June 2019.

Career

Leixões
Paulo Daniel Fernandes Tavares was born in Massarelos, and began his career in Senhora da Hora. He came through the junior ranks at Leixões to make his first team debut in the Segunda Liga (second tier) on 9 May 2004, coming on as a 77th-minute substitute for Bruno China in a 1–1 draw with Varzim at the Estádio do Mar. He went on to spend two years at Terceira Divisão (fourth tier) club Padroense, helping them to finish 13th in Série B in 2004–05 and 15th in 2005–06; with the latter campaign seeing the club relegated into the regional leagues (fifth tier). Tavares then joined Ribeirão on loan, making 20 appearances in the 2006–07 campaign as the club finished fourth in Segunda Divisão – Série A (third tier). He then featured in 17 league games in the 2007–08 season, before moving back up to the Liga de Honra (second tier) with Estoril. He scored two goals in 13 league games for Estoril, who ended the 2007–08 season in seventh place.

He returned to the first team at Leixões in 2008, with the club now in the Primeira Liga (first tier). Initially a squad player under José Mota, he featured in just four league games in both the 2008–09 and 2009–10 campaigns. The club were relegated in 2009–10, and Tavares played 12 games in the 2010–11 campaign, before he secured a first team place in the 2011–12, scoring seven goals in 34 appearances.

Vitória Setúbal
Tavares then returned to the Primeira Liga to sign with Vitória Setúbal in July 2012, now coached by José Mota. He scored twice in 32 games in the 2012–13 season, helping the club to finish two points above the relegation zone. He then scored five goals (including four penalties) in 18 games in 2013–14 as Vitória posted a seventh-place finish, though missed four months of the season with a fractured toe. He signed a new two-year contract in April 2014. He scored twice in 32 matches in the 2014–15 campaign as Vitória finished in 14th place, and he featured 22 times in the 2015–16 season as the club finished just one point above the relegation zone. He was offered a new two-year contract by new manager José Couceiro in May 2016. However, he decided to reject the offer and look for a new club.

Port Vale
Tavares signed a two-year contract with EFL League One club Port Vale in July 2016, in a move that reunited him with former Vitória manager Bruno Ribeiro. He started the first five league games of the 2016–17 season, before picking up a hamstring injury at the end of August. He quickly returned to the first team, and along with Kjell Knops was only one of two of the club's 11 overseas signings to secure a regular place in the starting eleven. However Ribeiro resigned on Boxing day, and Tavares found his first team chances very limited under caretaker-manager Michael Brown so instead used his time to help coach the under-9 and under-10 teams. Tavares left Vale Park after agreeing to a settlement on the remainder of his contract in May 2017.

Later career
On 12 August 2017, Tavares returned to Portugal and signed with newly promoted LigaPro club Cova da Piedade. He played 16 games for the "Rapazes de Azul-Grená" over the 2017–18 season, and was sent off on his final appearance for the club on 11 February, in a 1–0 defeat to Vitória S.C. B at the Estádio D. Afonso Henriques.

In February 2018, Tavares signed with Vietnamese V.League 1 club Hồ Chí Minh City. He returned to Portugal and in June 2019 signed with Campeonato de Portugal side Lusitânia. He had an eventful home debut on 12 October, getting sent off for a second yellow card moments after scoring the winning goal in a 2–1 victory over Leça. Lusitânia were second in Serie B when the 2019–20 season was curtailed early due to the COVID-19 pandemic in Portugal. He played 23 games in the 2020–21 season, helping Lusitânia to win promotion into Liga 3. He played 24 games in the 2021–22 season as Lusitânia were relegated back to the fourth tier.

Career statistics

References

1985 births
Living people
Footballers from Porto
Portuguese footballers
Portuguese expatriate footballers
Association football midfielders
Leixões S.C. players
Padroense F.C. players
G.D. Ribeirão players
G.D. Estoril Praia players
Vitória F.C. players
Port Vale F.C. players
C.D. Cova da Piedade players
Lusitânia F.C. players
Liga Portugal 2 players
Segunda Divisão players
Primeira Liga players
English Football League players
V.League 1 players
Campeonato de Portugal (league) players
Association football coaches
Port Vale F.C. non-playing staff
Portuguese expatriate sportspeople in England
Portuguese expatriate sportspeople in Vietnam
Expatriate footballers in England
Expatriate footballers in Vietnam